Myles O'Reilly may refer to:

 Myles O'Reilly (politician) (1825–1880), Catholic soldier, MP and publicist
 Myles O'Reilly (musician) (born 1973), Irish musician